Nikolay Penkov (born 17 December 1947) is a former Bulgarian international footballer who played as a defender.

Between 1969 and 1981 Penkov played in 334 matches for Botev Vratsa, scoring 14 goals. In 1971 with the club he played in the two matches against Dinamo Zagreb of UEFA Cup.

For Bulgaria national football team, Penkov was capped 2 times.

References

1947 births
Living people
Bulgarian footballers
Bulgaria international footballers
FC Botev Vratsa players
First Professional Football League (Bulgaria) players
Association football defenders
People from Vratsa